Poolbeg Press is an Irish book publisher established in 1976.

Genres
It publishes romantic fiction, literary fiction and non-fiction as well as children's fiction.

Authors
Authors published by Poolbeg Press include Maeve Binchy, Patricia Scanlan, Marian Keyes, Cathy Kelly, Sheila O'Flanagan, Colette Caddle and Melissa Hill. It is known especially for identifying and promoting new Irish writers, particularly female authors.

Imprints
In 2014 Poolbeg Press brought back the Ward River Press imprint. This is an imprint for contemporary Irish fiction.

References 

Publishing companies established in 1976
Publishing companies of Ireland
Book publishing companies of Ireland